The Kuala Muda District is a district in Kedah, Malaysia. Sungai Petani is the administrative center of the district. Kuala Muda district is in close proximity to the border of Kedah and Penang. Apart from Sungai Petani, other major towns in the district include Tikam Batu, Padang Tembusu, Sungai Lalang, Bedong, Bukit Selambau, Sidam, Gurun, Semeling, Merbok, Kota Kuala Muda and Tanjung Dawai. The Mount Jerai is shared with the neighboring district of Yan while the Muda River is shares the bordering state of Penang. The iconic Jambatan Merdeka (Independent Bridge) connect both Tikam Batu with Bumbung Lima in Penang. Kuala Muda is the second largest and most populous district in Kedah, and it is also the site of some of the earliest civilization site in the country.

History 
The name Kuala Muda may derived from the river that cut cross the southern part of Kedah, Sungai Muda (Muda River) which meets the Strait of Melaka in the fishing village of Kampung Sungai Muda, Kota Kuala Muda. Confluences of the river were also part of the Kedah history; Sungai Merbok and Sungai Mas harboured among the earliest civilization in the country, Sungai Sungai Petani, Sungai Semeling and Sungai Ketil. Ancient ruins and artifacts can be found across the districts, from temple-like structures or candis, the Kota Kuala Muda Gates, ancient boats called Perahu Sagor, glass beads, Buddhist and Hindu statues and potteries.

The district suffered from the 2004 tsunami which caused 11 casualties.

Administrative divisions
Kuala Muda District is divided into 16 mukims, which are:
 Bujang
 Bukit Meriam
 Gurun
 Haji Kudong
 Kota
 Kuala
 Merbok
 Pekula
 Pinang Tunggal
 Rantau Panjang
 Semeling
 Sidam Kiri
 Simpor
 Sungai Pasir
 Sungai Petani
 Teloi Kiri

Demographics

Federal Parliament and State Assembly Seats

List of Kuala Muda district representatives in the Federal Parliament (Dewan Rakyat) 

List of Kuala Muda district representatives in the State Legislative Assembly (Dewan Undangan Negeri)

See also

 Districts of Malaysia

References

 
Northern Corridor Economic Region